Supeno (June 12, 1916 – February 24, 1949) was the Minister of Development/Youth at First Hatta Cabinet. He died while still serving in the department as a result of the Dutch Military Aggression II. Supeno is now regarded as a National Hero of Indonesia.

Biography

Early life
Soepeno born in Pekalongan, Central Java, on June 12, 1916. He was the son of an officer of the Tegal Station Soemarno. Accessed After graduating from High school (AMS) in Semarang, she went to Technical High School (Technische Hogeschool) in Bandung. Only two years old, studying in school it's because he moved to the High School of Law (Recht Hogeschool) in Jakarta. In the city, staying in hostels Soepeno Assembly of Students Indonesia (RMIC) in Jalan Cikini Raya 71. Therefore, his colleagues, he was selected as the head of the hostel.

Being Minister
In the First Hatta Cabinet, he was appointed Minister of Youth and Sports.

Death
When the Dutch invaded Indonesia on December 19, 1948, the Minister of Youth and Supeno RI Development. Supeno joined a guerrilla force, while the Dutch soldiers continue to track him down. Several months after joining the guerrilla, Supeno and his party were finally caught at Ganter Village, Nganjuk, when the Dutch invaded the territory on the 24th of February, 1949. After he was caught, the Dutch forced him to squat as they interrogated. They asked him over and over who he is, while he insists that he is a local from the village, since he was looked and dressed like the locals. While the Dutch continued to interrogate him, he refused to give up any information and continued to remain silent. Finally the Dutch soldier put a gun against his temple, to intimidate him even further. When he stayed firm, without fear in his eyes, they pulled the trigger and executed him on the spot, along with six other members of the guerrilla.

Supeno was then buried in Nganjuk. A year later, his tomb was transferred to TMP Semaki, Yogyakarta.

References

1916 births
1949 deaths
National Heroes of Indonesia
Assassinated people